The 2011–12 Liga Alef season saw Hapoel Asi Gilboa (champions of the North Division) and Maccabi Yavne (champions of the South Division) win their regional divisions and qualify for promotion play-offs. Maccabi Yavne won the promotion play-offs and promoted to Liga Leumit.

After playing 8 matches, Maccabi Ironi Jatt (playing in South division) withdrew from the league and their record was annulled, leaving to South division to be played with 15 clubs.

The bottom two clubs in North division, Maccabi Tamra and Ahi Acre and the bottom club in South division, Maccabi HaShikma Ramat Hen were all automatically relegated to Liga Bet, whilst the two clubs which were ranked in 14th place in each division, Hapoel Hadera and Maccabi Ironi Netivot entered a promotion/relegation play-offs, Hapoel Hadera prevailing to stay in Liga Alef, while Maccabi Ironi Netivot were relegated after losing the play-offs.

Changes from last season

Format changes
 Due to the reduction of the Premier League from 16 to 14 clubs, and as Liga Leumit remained with 16 clubs, only one club was to be promoted from Liga Alef to Liga Leumit. Thus, the two regional champions of Liga Alef was to face each other in two legged promotion play-offs.

Team changes
 Maccabi Umm al-Fahm and Hapoel Jerusalem were promoted to Liga Leumit; Ahva Arraba (to North division) and Maccabi Ironi Jatt (to South division) were relegated from Liga Leumit.
 Ironi Sayid Umm al-Fahm, Maccabi Kafr Qara and Hapoel Ramot Menashe Megiddo were relegated to Liga Bet from North division; Maccabi Sektzia Ma'alot-Tarshiha, Maccabi Daliyat al-Karmel and F.C. Givat Olga were promoted to the North division from Liga Bet.
 Hapoel Nahlat Yehuda, Hapoel Tzafririm Holon and Shimshon Bnei Tayibe were relegated to Liga Bet from South division; Beitar Kfar Saba, Hapoel Katamon Jerusalem and Ortodoxim Lod were promoted to the South division from Liga Bet.

North Division

South Division

Maccabi Ironi Jatt withdrew after playing 8 matches and folded. their results were annulled.

Promotion play-offs
Liga Alef North champions, Hapoel Asi Gilboa and Liga Alef South champions Maccabi Yavne faced each other in the promotion play-offs. the winner on aggregate earned a spot in the 2012–13 Liga Leumit. The matches took place on May 11 and 18, 2012.

Maccabi Yavne won on away goals (2–2 on aggregate) and promoted to Liga Leumit.

Relegation play-offs

North play-off
The 14th placed club in Liga Alef North, Hapoel Hadera, faced Tzeirei Bir al-Maksur (which lost the Liga Bet promotion play-offs to Hapoel Migdal HaEmek 5-6 on penalties after 0-0). the winner earned a spot in the 2012–13 Liga Alef.

Hapoel Hadera remained in Liga Alef.

South play-off
The 14th placed club in Liga Alef South, Maccabi Ironi Netivot, faced Hapoel Azor (which lost the Liga Bet promotion play-offs to Maccabi Sha'arayim 1-2). the winner earned a spot in the 2012–13 Liga Alef.

Maccabi Ironi Netivot relegated to Liga Bet.

References
Liga Alef North 2011/2012 The Israel Football Association 
Liga Alef South 2011/2012 The Israel Football Association 

3
Liga Alef seasons
Israel Liga Alef